Natalya Akhrimenko (born May 12, 1955 in Novokuybyshevsk, Samara Oblast) is a retired track and field shot putter from Russia, best known for competing at the 1980 Summer Olympics in Moscow, USSR. There she ended up in seventh place, just like eight years later in Seoul, South Korea.

Achievements

References
 
 

1955 births
Living people
Russian female shot putters
Soviet female shot putters
Athletes (track and field) at the 1980 Summer Olympics
Athletes (track and field) at the 1988 Summer Olympics
Olympic athletes of the Soviet Union
European Athletics Championships medalists
Universiade medalists in athletics (track and field)
Goodwill Games medalists in athletics
Universiade bronze medalists for the Soviet Union
Medalists at the 1983 Summer Universiade
Competitors at the 1986 Goodwill Games